The fourth season of Dancing Brasil premiered on Wednesday, September 26, 2018 at 11:00 p.m. (BRT / AMT) on RecordTV.

On December 5, 2018, actress Pérola Faria & Fernando Perrotti won the competition with 50.22% of the public vote over singer Lu Andrade & Marquinhos Costa (21.22%), actor Allan Souza Lima & Carol Dias (15.76%) and former football player Amaral & Bruna Bays (12.81%). This was the first season to feature four finalists instead of three.

Cast

Couples

Scoring chart

Key
 
 
  Eliminated
  Risk zone
  Immunity
  Fourth place
  Third place
  Runner-up
  Winner

Weekly scores
Individual judges' scores in the charts below (given in parentheses) are listed in this order from left to right: Jaime Arôxa, Fernanda Chamma, Paulo Goulart Filho.

Week 1: First Dances 
The couples performed pasodoble, jive, quickstep, foxtrot, rumba, tango, zouk, cha-cha-cha or samba.

Running order

Week 2: Life Moments 
The couples performed one unlearned dance to celebrate the most memorable moment of their lives. Waltz is introduced.

Running order

Week 3: When I Grow Up 
The couples performed one unlearned dance to showcase what they aimed to be when they grow up.

Running order

Week 4: Movie Night 
The couples performed one unlearned dance to famous film songs.

Running order

Week 5: Brazil Night 
The couples performed one unlearned dance to classic or popular Brazilian songs.

Running order

Week 6: Michael Jackson Night 
The couples performed one unlearned dance to classic songs by Michael Jackson.

Running order

Week 7: Free Theme 
The couples performed one unlearned dance.

Djeiko Henes was unable to perform on this week's live show, so Camila Rodrigues danced with eliminated pro Lucas Nunes instead.

Running order

Week 8: Team Dances 
The couples performed one unlearned dance and a team dance-off for extra points. Contemporary, jazz, hip-hop and salsa are introduced.

Djeiko Henes had to withdraw from the competition, so Lucas Nunes replaced him as Camila Rodrigues' partner for the rest of the season.

Running order

Week 9: Rock and Roll Night 
The couples performed one unlearned dance to iconic rock songs.

Running order

After the individual routines were performed, the bottom three couples (Amaral & Bruna, Camila & Lucas and Lu & Marquinhos) competed in a marathon-style instant cha-cha-cha. Since the three couples tied after received one vote each, a new round was made, this time, of an instant tango. With two votes, Lu & Marquinhos received immunity and avoided elimination, while the remaining couples were placed in the Risk Zone. Camila & Lucas received the fewest votes to save and were eliminated over Amaral & Bruna.

Running order

Week 10: Semifinals 
The couples performed an unlearned dance, with one couple being eliminated midway through the show.

Running order (round 1)

Following Juliana & Tutu's elimination, the five remaining couples performed their final unlearned dance.

Running order (round 2)

Week 11: Finals 
The couples performed a redemption dance  chosen by the judges and a showdance that fused three previously learned dance styles.

Running order

Dance chart 
 Week 1: One unlearned dance (First Dances)
 Week 2: One unlearned dance (Life Moments)
 Week 3: One unlearned dance (When I Grow Up)
 Week 4: One unlearned dance (Movie Night)
 Week 5: One unlearned dance (Brazil Night)
 Week 6: One unlearned dance (Michael Jackson Night)
 Week 7: One unlearned dance (Free Theme)
 Week 8: One unlearned dance (Team Dances)
 Week 9: One unlearned dance (Rock and Roll Night)
 Week 10: Two unlearned dances (Semifinals)
 Week 11: Redemption dance and showdance (Finals)

 Highest scoring dance
 Lowest scoring dance

Ratings and reception

Brazilian ratings
All numbers are in points and provided by Kantar Ibope Media.

 In 2018, each point represents 248.647 households in 15 market cities in Brazil (71.855 households in São Paulo)

References

External links 

 Dancing Brasil on R7.com

2018 Brazilian television seasons